The rufous-backed antvireo (Dysithamnus xanthopterus) is a species of bird in the family Thamnophilidae. It is endemic to Brazil.

Its natural habitat is subtropical or tropical moist montane forests.

References

External links
Xeno-canto: audio recordings of the rufous-backed antvireo

Dysithamnus
Birds of the Atlantic Forest
Endemic birds of Brazil
Birds described in 1856
Taxonomy articles created by Polbot